XGE can refer to:

 Xoreax Grid Engine, a grid computing engine for the Windows environment
 Xanathar's Guide to Everything (XGtE), an accessory for the 5th edition of the Dungeons & Dragons fantasy role-playing game
 An international signal for "I Surrender"; see 
 A graphics subsystem used in the SG Indy